Reo Purgyil, sometimes known as Leo Pargial and Leo Pargil, is a mountain peak at the southern end of the Zanskar Range in the Western Himalaya. It is located the border between Himachal Pradesh, India and Tibet, China.

At 6,816 m, Reo Purgyil is the highest mountain peak in the state of Himachal Pradesh and is located in Kinnaur district. Geologically the peak is a dome structure and is part of a great massif that rises above the Sutlej river and overlooks the western valleys of Tibet. The Spiti River, a right bank tributary of the Satluj, drains the northern face of the massif.

The highest peak is often obscured by clouds and is located about 2 km to the south of Peak 6791, a well known slightly shorter twin with a height of 6,791 m. Peak 6791 is widely referred to as Leo Pargial and has sufficient topographic prominence to be classified as a mountain in its own right.  Nako village is located on the slopes of the mountain, close to the India-Tibet border.

Climbing history
 1st official ascent (1971) by ITBP (Indo Tibetan Border Police)
 2nd ascent (1991) by E. Theophilus and team
 2018 ascent by Rajsekhar Maity and a Bengali team 
 2022 ascent by 12 members of ITBP led by  Deputy Commandant Kuldeep Singh and the Deputy Leader was Deputy Commandant Dharmendra.  Reportedly the only successful mountaineering expedition in North India during the COVID-19 pandemic

See also
Geography of Himachal Pradesh
List of peaks in Himachal Pradesh
List of mountains in India
List of mountains by elevation

References

External links
Khab, Kinnour, Himachal Pradesh, India
Dome formation and extension in the Tethyan Himalaya, Leo Pargil, northwest India - University of California, Santa Barbara

Himalayas
Highest points of Indian states and union territories
Mountains of Himachal Pradesh
Geography of Kinnaur district
Six-thousanders of the Himalayas